Girls to Marry is a 1932 German romantic comedy film directed by Wilhelm Thiele and starring Renate Müller, Hermann Thimig and Wolf Albach-Retty. It was shot at the Babelsberg Studios in Berlin. The film's sets were designed by the art director Hans Jacoby. It was remade the same year in Britain as Marry Me, also directed by Wilhelm Thiele, with Müller starring again.

Cast
 Renate Müller as Gerda Arnhold
 Hermann Thimig as Robert Goll
 Wolf Albach-Retty as Paul, sein Bruder
 Gustl Gstettenbaur as Willi, sein Bruder
 Fritz Grünbaum as Sigurd Bernstein, Heiratsvermittler
 Willi Grill as Meyer, sein Sekretär
 S.Z. Sakall as Alois Novak
 Gertrud Wolle as Frau Krause
 Oskar Sima as Direktor Korten
 Margita Alfvén
 Ilse Fürstenberg
 Else Ward
 Ludwig Donath
 Erich Dunskus
 Das Mikro Jazz und Konzert-Orchester as Orchester
 Melody Gents as Singer

References

Bibliography

External links 
 

1932 films
1932 romantic comedy films
German romantic comedy films
Films of the Weimar Republic
1930s German-language films
Films directed by Wilhelm Thiele
German multilingual films
German black-and-white films
Films with screenplays by Franz Schulz
1932 multilingual films
1930s German films
Films shot at Babelsberg Studios